The men's 100 metres event at the 1979 Summer Universiade was held at the Estadio Olimpico Universitario in Mexico City on 8 and 9 September 1979.

Medalists

Results

Heats
Held on 8 September

Wind:Heat 1: +0.6  m/s, Heat 2: +0.7 m/s, Heat 3: +0.8  m/s, Heat 4: 0.0 m/s, Heat 5: +0.1  m/s, Heat 6: 0.0  m/s, Heat 7: +0.2  m/s

Semifinals
Held on 9 September

Wind:Heat 1: +0.6 m/s, Heat 2: +0.8 m/s, Heat 3: +0.6 m/s

Final
Held on 9 September

Wind: 0.0 m/s

References

Athletics at the 1979 Summer Universiade
1979